The bibliography covers the main scholarly books, and a few articles, dealing with the History of Japan

Surveys and reference
 Allinson, Gary D.  The Columbia Guide to Modern Japanese History. (1999). 259 pp. excerpt and text search
 Beasley, W. G. The Modern History of Japan (1963) 
 Clement, Ernest Wilson. A Short History of Japan (1915), 190pp  online edition
 Cullen, L. M. A History of Japan, 1582-1941: Internal and External Worlds   (2003)
 Edgerton, Robert B.  Warriors of the Rising Sun: A History of the Japanese Military. (1999). 384 pp.  excerpt and text search
 Duus, Peter. Modern Japan (2nd ed 1998) online
 Goedertier Joseph M. A Dictionary of Japanese History. 1968.
 Gordon, Andrew. A Modern History of Japan: From Tokugawa Times to the Present (2003) excerpt and text search
 Hall, John Whitney. Japan: From Prehistory to Modern Times (New York: Delacorte Press, 1970)
 Hane, Mikiso. Modern Japan: A Historical Survey 2nd ed Westview Press, 1992, 474pp
 Henshall, Kenneth. A history of Japan: from stone age to superpower (Palgrave Macmillan, 2012)
 Huffman, James L., ed.  Modern Japan: An Encyclopedia of History, Culture, and Nationalism. (1998). 316 pp. 
 Hunter Janet. Concise Dictionary of Modern Japanese History. (1984). online
 Iwao, Seiichi. Biographical dictionary of Japanese history (1978) online
 Jansen, Marius B. The Making of Modern Japan (2002) excerpts and search online
 McClain, James L.  Japan: A Modern History. (2001). 512 pp.  excerpt and text search
 Morley, James William, ed. Japan's foreign policy, 1868-1941: a research guide (Columbia UP, 1974), Chapters by international experts who cover  military policy, economic policy, cultural policy, and relations with Britain, China, Germany, Russia, and the United States; 635pp
 Mosk, Carl.  Japanese Industrial History: Technology, Urbanization, and Economic Growth. M. E. Sharpe, 2001. 293 pp. 
 Najita, Tetsuo. Japan: The Intellectual Foundations of Modern Japanese Politics (1980), 200 year interpretation excerpt and text search
 Perez, Louis G. The History of Japan (1998) 244pp
 Perkins, Dorothy. Encyclopedia of Japan : Japanese history and culture, from abacus to zori (1991) online free to borrow 410 pp. 
 Reischauer, Edwin O. Japan: The Story of a Nation. 1990.
 Reischauer, Edwin O., and Albert M. Craig. Japan, Tradition and Transformation 1978.
 Sims, Richard.  Japanese Political History since the Meiji Renovation, 1868-2000. (2001). 395 pp. 
 Stockwin, J. A. A. Dictionary of the Modern Politics of Japan. (2003). 291pp  * Tipton, Elise. Modern Japan: A Social and Political History (2002) excerpt and text search
 Totman, Conrad.  A History of Japan. (3rd ed 2014). 620 pp.; stress on environment  excerpts and search
 Totman, Conrad. Early Modern Japan: A Short History (1995)  excerpt and text search
 Totman, Conrad. Japan before Perry (2nd paperback ed. 2008) excerpt and text search
 Totman, Conrad. Japan: An Environmental History (2014)
  Umesao, Tadao.  An Ecological View of History: Japanese Civilization in the World Context. Melbourne: Trans Pacific Press, 2003. 208 pp.

East Asian history
 Best, Antony, ed. The International History of East Asia, 1900-1968: Trade, Ideology and the Quest for Order (London: Routledge, 2010). 
 Chickering, Roger, and Stig Förster, eds. The Shadows of Total War: Europe, East Asia, and the United States, 1919-1939 (New York: Cambridge University Press, 2003). * Clyde, Paul Hibbert. The Far East: A History of the Impact of the West on Eastern Asia. (New York: Prentice-Hall, 1948). * Clyde, Paul Hibbert. A History of the Modern and Contemporary Far East: A Survey of Western Contacts with Eastern Asia during the Nineteenth and Twentieth Centuries (New York: Prentice-Hall, 1937). * Ebrey, Patricia Buckley, and Anne Walthall. East Asia: A Cultural, Social, and Political History (2 vol. 2008-2013)
 Field, Andrew. Royal Navy Strategy in the Far East, 1919-1939: Preparing for War against Japan (Portland, OR: Frank Cass, 2003). 
 Holcombe, Charles. A History of East Asia: From the Origins of Civilization to the Twenty-First Century (2010)
 Jensen, Richard, Jon Davidann, and Yoneyuki Sugita, eds. Trans-Pacific Relations: America, Europe, and Asia in the Twentieth Century (Westport, CT: Praeger, 2003). 
 Lipman, Jonathan N. and Barbara A. Molony. Modern East Asia: An Integrated History (2011)
 Nimmo, William F. Stars and Stripes across the Pacific: The United States, Japan, and Asia/Pacific Region, 1895-1945 (Praeger, 2001). excerpt
 Prescott, Anne. East Asia in the World: An Introduction (2015)
 Reid, Anthony. A History of Southeast Asia: Critical Crossroads (Blackwell History of the World, 2015)
 Shavit, David. The United States in Asia: A Historical Dictionary (Greenwood Press, 1990).
 Vogel, Ezra F. China and Japan: Facing History (Harvard University Press, 2019) in-depth comparative history. excerpt

to 1860
 Clulow, Adam. The Company and the Shogun: The Dutch Encounter with Tokugawa Japan (Columbia University Press, 2014)
 Friday, Karl F., ed. Japan Emerging: Premodern History to 1850 (Westview Press, 2012)
 Gerstle, C. Andrew. 18th Century Japan: Culture and Society (Routledge, 2012)
 Gramlich-Oka, Bettina, and Gregory Smits, eds. Economic Thought in Early Modern Japan. V. 1, Monies, Markets, and Finance in East Asia (Leiden: Brill, 2010)
  Hall, John W. ed. Cambridge History of Japan, Vol. IV, Early Modern Japan. (1991). 831pp
 Hall, S. Japan before Tokugawa: political consolidation and economic growth, 1500-1650 (Princeton University Press, 2014)
 Hane, Mikiso. Premodern Japan: A Historical Survey (1991)
 Hanley, Susan B. and Kozo Yamamura. Economic and Demographic Change in Preindustrial Japan, 1600-1868 (1977)
 Jansen, Marius B., ed.  The Cambridge History of Japan. Vol. 5: The Nineteenth Century. (1989). 828 pp.  and text search
 Jansen, Marius B., and Gilbert Rozman, eds. Japan in transition: from Tokugawa to Meiji (Princeton University Press, 2014)
 Maruyama, Masao. Studies in Intellectual History of Tokugawa Japan (Princeton University Press, 2014)
 Sansom, Sir George B. A History of Japan, 3 vols. 1963, in dense, sophisticated prose  vol 1 to 1334, excerpts and search V. 2 (to 1615) and search V. 3 (to 1867)
 Smitka, Michael, ed. The Japanese economy in the Tokugawa era, 1600-1868 (Routledge, 2012)
 
 Williams, E. Leslie. Japan Before Meiji: A Short Cultural History (University of Hawai'I Press, 2014)
 Wilson, George M.  Patriots and Redeemers in Japan: Motives in the Meiji Restoration. (1992). 201 pp. 
 Yamamura Kozo, ed. Cambridge History of Japan, Vol. III. Medieval Japan. (1990).
 Yamamura, Kozo. "Toward a Reexamination of the Economic History of Tokugawa Japan, 1600-1867." Journal of Economic History 33(3) (1973) pp. 509–546. in Jstor

1860 to 1945
  Akagi, Roy Hidemichi. Japan's Foreign Relations 1542-1936: A Short History (1979) online 560pp.
 Bix, Herbert P. Hirohito and the Making of Modern Japan (HarperCollins, 2001), a standard biography online; Pulitzer Prize. 
 Bix, Herbert. "Emperor Hirohito's war." History Today 41.12 (1991): 12-19; short popular summary

 Black, Cyril, et al. eds. The Modernization of Japan and Russia: A Comparative Study (1977)
 Borton, Hugh. Japan's modern century (2nd ed 1970), 1850 to 1970; university textbook; online
 Cohen, Jerome B. Japan's Economy in War and Reconstruction (1949) 545 pp. 
 Dickinson, Frederick R. "Toward a Global Perspective of the Great War: Japan and the Foundations of a Twentieth-Century World." American Historical Review (2014) 119#4 pp1154–1183. The role of World War I
 Dower, John W.  War without Mercy: Race and Power in the Pacific War. Pantheon, 1986. 398 pp.  excerpt and text search
 Duus, Peter, ed.  The Cambridge History of Japan: Vol. 6: The Twentieth Century. (1989). 866 pp. 
 Havens, Thomas R. Valley of Darkness: The Japanese People and World War II. 1978.
 Havens, Thomas R. "Women and War in Japan, 1937–1945." American Historical Review 80 (1975): 913–934. online in JSTOR
 Hunter, Janet. The emergence of modern Japan: an introductory history since 1853 (Routledge, 2014)
 Iriye, Akira. Power and Culture: The Japanese-American War, 1941-1945 (1981),
 Jansen, Marius B. and Rozman, Gilbert, eds. Japan in Transition, from Tokugawa to Meiji. (1986). 485 pp. modernization models
 Keene, Donald.  Emperor of Japan: Meiji and His World , 1852-1912. (2002). 928 pp. 
 LaFeber, Walter.  The Clash: A History of U.S.-Japan Relations. (1997). 544 pp. 
 Megarry, Tim, ed. The Making of Modern Japan: A Reader (Greenwich University Press, 1995) 34 essays by scholars; 591pp
 Nakamura, Takafusa, et al. eds. Economic History of Japan 1914–1955: A Dual Structure (vol 3 2003)
 Perez, Louis G., ed. Japan at War: An Encyclopedia (2013) pp 477–98 excerpts and text search
 Ravina, Mark. To stand with the nations of the world: Japan's Meiji restoration in world history (Oxford UP, 2020) excerpt
 Sims, Richard.  Japanese Political History since the Meiji Renovation, 1868-2000. Palgrave, 2001. 395 pp. 
 Ward, Robert E., ed. Political Development in Modern Japan: Studies in the Modernization of Japan (Princeton University Press, 2015)
 Yoshimi, Yoshiaki. Grassroots Fascism: The War Experience of the Japanese People (Translated by Ethan Mark. Columbia University Press, 2015). 360 pp.  online review

Occupation: 1945-1952
 Buckley, Roger.  Occupation Diplomacy: Britain, the United States and Japan, 1945-1952. (1982). 294 pp. 
 Cohen, Jerome B. Japan's Economy in War and Reconstruction (1949) 545 pp. * Cohen, Theodore.  Remaking Japan: The American Occupation as New Deal. (1987). 526 pp.
 Cook, Haruko Taya, and Theodore Cook. Japan at War: An Oral History 1992.
 Dower, John. Japan in War and Peace 1993.
  Dower, John W.  Embracing Defeat: Japan in the Wake of World War II. (1999). 688 pp.  excerpt and text search
 Eldridge, Robert. The Origins of the Bilateral Okinawa Problem: Okinawa in Postwar US-Japan Relations, 1945-1952 (2001) excerpt and text search
 Finn, Richard B.  Winners in Peace: MacArthur, Yoshida, and Postwar Japan. (1992). 413 pp.  excerpt and text search
 Hane, Mikiso. Eastern Phoenix: Japan since 1945 (1996)
 Harvey, Robert.  American Shogun: General MacArthur, Emperor Hirohito, and the Drama of Modern Japan. (2006). 480 pp. 
 Hellegers, Dale M.  We, the Japanese People: World War II and the Origins of the Japanese Constitution. (2 vol. 2002). 826 pp. 
  Hewes Jr., Laurence I. Japan -- Land and Men: An Account of the Japanese Land Reform Program, 1945-51 154 pgs. (1955) 
 Hirano, Kyoko.  Mr. Smith Goes to Tokyo: The Japanese Cinema under the American Occupation, 1945-1952. (1992). 400 pp. 
 Koseki, Shoichi.  The Birth of Japan's Postwar Constitution. (1997). 257 pp 
 Koshiro, Yukiko.  Trans-Pacific Racisms and the U.S. Occupation of Japan. (1999). 295 pp. 
 Molasky, Michael S.  The American Occupation of Japan and Okinawa: Literature and Memory. (1999). 244 pp. 
 Moore, Ray A. and Robinson, Donald L.  Partners for Democracy: Crafting the New Japanese State under MacArthur. (2002). 409 pp. 
 Orbaugh, Sharalyn.  Japanese Fiction of the Allied Occupation: Vision, Embodiment, Identity. (2007). 515 pp.
 Sandler, Mark, ed.  The Confusion Era: Art and Culture in Japan during the Allied Occupation, 1945-52. (1998). 112 pp. 
 Schonberger, Howard B. Aftermath of War: Americans and the Remaking of Japan, 1945-1952 (1989)
 Schaller, Michael. The American Occupation of Japan: The Origins of the Cold War in Asia (1987) excerpt and text searcj
  Shibata, Masako.  Japan and Germany under the US Occupation: A Comparative Analysis of Post-War Education Reform. (2005). 212 pp. 
 Sodei, Rinjiro.  Dear General MacArthur: Letters from the Japanese during the American Occupation. (2001). 308 pp., primary sources
 Takemae, Eiji.  Inside GHQ: The Allied Occupation of Japan and Its Legacy. (2002). 800 pp. 
  VanStaaveren, Jacob.  An American in Japan, 1945-1948: A Civilian View of the Occupation. (1995). 286 pp.  primary course
 Ward, Robert E. and Yoshikazu, Sakamoto.  Democratizing Japan: The Allied Occupation. (1987). 456 pp. 
 Williams, Justin, Sr.  Japan's Political Revolution Under MacArthur: A Participant's Account. (1979). 317 pp.  primary source
 Yoshida, Shigeru. The Yoshida Memoirs: The Story of Japan in Crisis 1961, primary source online edition

Since 1952
  Allinson, Gary D.  Japan's Postwar History. (2nd ed 2004). 208 pp.   excerpt and text search
 Beauchamp, Edward R., ed. Education and Schooling in Japan since 1945 (Routledge, 2014)
 Chapman, J.W.M., Reinhard Drifte, and Ian T.M. Gow, eds. Japan's Quest for Comprehensive Security: Defence-Diplomacy-Dependence (A&C Black, 2013)
  Duus, Peter, ed.  The Cambridge History of Japan: Vol. 6: The Twentieth Century. (1989). 866 pp. 
 Hane, Mikiso. Eastern Phoenix: Japan since 1945 (1996) online edition 
 Hook, Glenn D. et al. Japan's International Relations: Politics, Economics and Security (2nd ed. Routledge, 2011)
 LaFeber, Walter.  The Clash: A History of U.S.-Japan Relations. (1997). 544 pp., The standard history 
 Neary, Ian. Leaders and leadership in Japan (Routledge, 2014)
 Scalapino, Robert A., ed. The Foreign Policy of Modern Japan (University of California Press, 1977)
 Shinoda, Tomohito. Contemporary Japanese Politics: Institutional Changes and Power Shifts (Columbia University Press, 2013)
 Sims, Richard.  Japanese Political History since the Meiji Renovation, 1868-2000. Palgrave, 2001. 395 pp. 
 Sugihara, Kaoru. Japan, China, and the Growth of the Asian International Economy, 1850-1949 - Vol. 1 (2005) online edition 
 Sumiya, Mikio, ed.  A History of Japanese Trade and Industry Policy. (2000). 662 pp.
 Van Wolferen, Karel. The enigma of Japanese power: People and politics in a stateless nation (1989)A that

Cultural and social history
 Craig, Albert M.; Shively, Donald H. Personality in Japanese History (1995)
 Dore, R. P. Aspects of Social Change in Modern Japan (1971)
 Dumoulin, Heinrich.  Zen Buddhism: A History. Vol. 2. Japan. (1989). 509 pp. 
 Duus, Peter, ed.  The Japanese Discovery of America: A Brief History with Documents. (1997). 226 pp. 
 Earhart, H. Byron. Japanese Religion: Unity and Diversity (1974).
 Guttmann, Allen and Thompson, Lee.  Japanese Sports: A History. (2001). 368 pp.
 Hanley, Susan B. and Kozo Yamamura. Economic and Demographic Change in Preindustrial Japan, 1600-1868 (1977)
 Harootunian, Harry.  History's Disquiet: Modernity, Cultural Practice, and the Question of Everyday Life. (2000). 182 pp. 
 Keene, Donald. Japanese Literature: An Introduction for Western Readers (1955)
 Morris, Ivan. The World of the Shining Prince: Court Life in Ancient Japan (1964)
  Kitagawa Joseph M. Religion in Japanese History. 1966.
 Kuitert, Wybe.  Themes in the History of Japanese Garden Art (2002). 283 pp. 
 Leiter, Samuel L.  A Kabuki Reader: History and Performance. (2002). 430 pp. 
 Mason, Penelope.  History of Japanese Art. (1993). 431 pp. 
 Morris-Suzuki, Tessa. A History of Japanese Economic Thought (1991) online edition 
 Munsterberg, Hugo. The Arts of Japan: An Illustrated History (1957)
 Roberts, Laurance P. A. Dictionary of Japanese Artists. Tokyo: 1976.
 Sansom, Sir George B. Japan, A Short Cultural History. 1978. online edition 
 Siever, Sharon Flowers in Salt: The Beginning of Feminine Consciousness in Modern Japan (1983)
 Standish, Isolde.  A New History of Japanese Cinema: A Century of Narrative Film. (2005). 452 pp.
 Stanley, Amy. Selling women: Prostitution, markets, and the household in early modern Japan (U of California Press, 2012). excerpt
 Thomas, James Edward. Modern Japan: a social history since 1868 (Routledge, 2017) excerpt
 Tonomura, Hitomi; Walthall, Anne; and Haruko, Wakita. Women and Class in Japanese History (1999). 
 Wakabayashi, Bob Tadashi.  Modern Japanese Thought. (1998). 403 pp. excerpt and text search
 Varley, Paul Herbert. Japanese Culture (4th ed. 2000). online

Economic history
 Allen, George. Short Economic History of Modern Japan (4th ed. 1981) online
 Cohen, Jerome B. Japan's Economy in War and Reconstruction (1949) 545 pp; on 1940s

 Black, Cyril, ed. The Modernization of Japan and Russia: A Comparative Study (1975) online
 Dore, Ronald. Taking Japan seriously: A Confucian perspective on leading economic issues (A&C Black, 2013).

 Ericson, Steven J. The Sound of the Whistle: Railroads and the State in Meiji Japan (Harvard Council on East Asian Studies, 1996).
 Ferris, William W. Japan to 1600: A Social and Economic History (2009)  excerpt and text search
 Flath, David. The Japanese Economy (3rd ed. Oxford UP, 2014), On current conditions.
 Gordon, Andrew, ed. Postwar Japan as History (1993), pp 99–188, 259-292 online
 Hayami, Akira; Saito, Osamu; and Toby, Ronald P., eds.  The Economic History of Japan, 1600-1990. Vol. 1: Emergence of Economic Society in Japan, 1600-1859. (2004). 420 pp.
 Kelley, Allen C. and Jeffrey G. Williamson, ed. Lessons from Japanese Development (1974)
 Kornicki, Peter F., ed. Meiji Japan: Political, Economic and Social History 1868–1912 (4 vol; 1998)  1336 pages of scholarly articles
 Kozo, Yamamura, and Yasuba Yasukichi, eds. The Political Economy of Japan: Volume 1—The Domestic Transformation (1987)
 Lechevalier, Sébastien, ed. The Great Transformation of Japanese Capitalism (2014) on 1980-2012 excerpt
 Morikawa, Hidemasa. A History of Top Management in Japan: Managerial Enterprises and Family Enterprises (2001) 
 Morley, James William, ed. Japan's foreign policy, 1868-1941: a research guide (Columbia UP, 1974), covers Japan's economic foreign policies, 1868–1893, pp 118–52
 Morris-Suzuki, Tessa. History of Japanese Economic Thought (1991)
 Nakamura, Takafusa, et al. eds. The Economic History of Japan: 1600–1990: Volume 1: Emergence of Economic Society in Japan, 1600–1859 (2004); Volume 3: Economic History of Japan 1914–1955: A Dual Structure (2003),
 Nakamura, James. Agricultural Production and the Economic Development of Japan, 1873–1922 (Princeton University Press, 1966)
 Ohtsu, Makoto.  Inside Japanese Business: A Narrative History, 1960-2000. (2002). 459pp.
 Patrick, Hugh, Sooned. Japanese Industrialization and Its Social Consequences (1977)
 Rosovsky, Henry. "Rumbles in the Rice Fields," Journal of Asian Studies (February 1968): vol. 27, No. 2 pp 347–60.
 Smitka, Michael, ed. The Japanese economy in the Tokugawa era, 1600-1868 (Routledge, 2012)
 Sugihara, Kaoru. Japan, China, and the Growth of the Asian International Economy, 1850-1949 - Vol. 1 
 Tolliday, Steven. The Economic Development of Modern Japan, 1868–1945: From the Meiji Restoration to the Second World War (2 vol; 2001), 1376pp; reprints 50 scholarly articles
 Yamamura, Kozo. "Toward a Reexamination of the Economic History of Tokugawa Japan, 1600-1867." Journal of Economic History (1973) 33#3 pp: 509–546. in Jstor

Foreign policy
 Akagi, Roy Hidemichi. Japan's Foreign Relations 1542-1936: A Short History (1979) online 560pp
 Beasley, William G. Japanese Imperialism, 1894–1945 (Oxford UP, 1987)
 Burns, Richard Dean, and Edward Moore Bennett. Diplomats in Crisis: United States-Chinese-Japanese Relations, 1919-1941 (ABC-Clio, 1974); bibliography
 Cooney, Kevin J. Japan's Foreign Policy Since 1945 (2006)
 Hook,  Glenn D. et al. Japan's International Relations: Politics, Economics and Security  (2011) excerpt and text search
 Inoguchi, Takashi. Japan's foreign policy in an era of global change (A&C Black, 2013)
 Iriye, Akira. Japan and the wider world: from the mid-nineteenth century to the present (Longman, 1997)
 Jung-Sun, Han. "Rationalizing the Orient: The" East Asia Cooperative Community" in Prewar Japan." Monumenta Nipponica (2005): 481-514. in JSTOR
 Lafeber, Walter. The Clash: A History of U.S.-Japan Relations (1997), a standard scholarly history
 Langdon, Frank. Japan's foreign policy (U. British Columbia Press, 2011)
 Langer, William L. The diplomacy of imperialism: 1890-1902 (2nd ed. 1951), world diplomatic history
 Maslow, Sebastian, Ra Mason and Paul O’Shea, eds. Risk State: Japan’s Foreign Policy In An Age Of Uncertainty (Ashgate. 2015) 202pp excerpt
 Morley, James William, ed. Japan's foreign policy, 1868-1941: a research guide (Columbia UP, 1974), comprehensive coverage of diplomatic & military & cultural relations
 Nish, Ian Hill. The origins of the Russo-Japanese war (1985)
 Nish, Ian. Japanese Foreign Policy, 1869-1942: Kasumigaseki to Miyakezaka (2001)
 Nish, Ian. (1990) "An Overview of Relations between China and Japan, 1895–1945." China Quarterly (1990) 124 (1990): 601–623. online
 Scalapino, Robert A.,  and Edwin O. Reischauer, eds. The Foreign Policy of Modern Japan (1977)
 Shimamoto, Mayako, Koji Ito,  and Yoneyuki Sugita. Historical Dictionary of Japanese Foreign Policy (2015)  excerpt
 Sun, Youli, and You-Li Sun. China and the Origins of the Pacific War, 1931-1941 (New York: St. Martin's Press, 1993)
 White, John Albert. The Diplomacy of the Russo-Japanese War (Princeton UP, 1964)
 Young, Louise. "Rethinking empire: Lessons from imperial and post-imperial Japan." The Oxford handbook of the ends of empire (2018): 212-230. online

Military history

 Drea, Edward J. Japan's Imperial Army: Its Rise and Fall, 1853 - 1945 (2016) online
 Edgerton, Robert B. Warriors of the Rising Sun: A History of the Japanese Military (1997) 
 Farris, William Wayne. Heavenly Warriors: The Evolution of Japan's Military, 500–1300 (Harvard East Asian Monographs) (1996)
 Field, Andrew. Royal Navy Strategy in the Far East, 1919-1939: Preparing for War against Japan (Frank Cass, 2003). 
 Friday K. F. "Bushido or Bull? A Medieval Historian's Perspective on the Imperial Army and the Japanese Warrior Tradition," The History Teacher (1994) 27:339–349, in JSTOR
 Harries, M. and S. Harries. Soldiers of the Sun: The Rise and Fall of the Imperial Japanese Army (1991).
 Morley, James William, ed. Japan's foreign policy, 1868-1941: a research guide (Columbia UP, 1974), Covers " Japan's military foreign policies.", pp 3–117
 Nitobe Inazō. Bushido: The Soul of Japan (Rutland, VT: Charles E. Tuttle, 1969)
 Perez, Louis G., ed. Japan at War: An Encyclopedia (Santa Barbara, CA: ABC-Clio, 2013). 
 Pike, Francis. Hirohito's War: The Pacific War, 1941-1945 (2016) excerpt
 Steinberg, John W., Bruce W. Menning, David Schimmelpenninck Van Der Oye, Shinji Yokote, and David Wolff, eds. The Russo-Japanese War in Global Perspective: World War Zero. Boston: Brill, 2005. 
 Turnbull, Stephen (2002). War in Japan: 1467–1615. Oxford: Osprey Publishing.

Historiography
 Allinson, Gary D.  The Columbia Guide to Modern Japanese History. (1999). 259 pp. excerpt and text search
  Beasley W. G., and E. G. Pulleyblank, eds. Historians of China and Japan. 1961. 
 Bix, Herbert P. "Hiroshima in History and Memory: A Symposium, Japan's Delayed Surrender: A Reinterpretation." Diplomatic History 19.2 (1995): 197-225.
 Bix, Herbert P. "ar Responsibilit and Historical Memor: Hirohito's Apparition." Asia-Pacific Journal| Japan Focus 6#5 (2008) 1–18. online

 Cullen, L. M. A History of Japan, 1582–1941: Internal and External Worlds (2003) pp 302–20.
 Hardacre, Helen and Kern, Adam L., eds.  New Directions in the Study of Meiji Japan. (1997). 782 pp. 
 Hein, Laura, and Akiko Takenaka. "Exhibiting World War II in Japan and the United States since 1995." Pacific Historical Review 76.1 (2007): 61-94.
 Tanaka, Stefan. Japan's Orient: Rendering Pasts into History (1995), How Japanese historians created the equivalent of an "Orient" and built a new national historiography.
 Wray, Harry, and Hilary Conroy, eds. Japan Examined: Perspectives on Modern Japanese History (1983), historiography

Scholarly journals
 East Asian History
 Journal of Japanese Studies
 Korean Studies
 Monumenta Nipponica, Japanese studies (in English)
 Sino-Japanese Studies
 Social Science Japan Journal

Primary sources
  full text of useful travel guide
  Cook, Haruko Taya and Cook, Theodore F. eds. Japan at War: An Oral History. (1992). 504 pp., World War II homefront excerpt and text search
 De Bary, Wm Theodore, et al eds. Sources of Japanese tradition: 1600 to 2000 (2 vol; Columbia University Press, 2005). vol 1 to 1600 online; vol 1-2 1958 edition
 Lu, David J. Japan: A Documentary History: V. 1: The Dawn of History to the Late Eighteenth Century (Routledge, 2015); Japan: A Documentary History: V. 2: The Late Tokugawa Period to the Present (Routledge, 2015) excerpt vol 2
 Huffman, James L. ed. Modern Japan: A History in Documents (New York: Oxford University Press, 2004). 
  Tsunoda, Ryusaku, W. T. de Bary, and Donald Keene, eds. Sources of Japanese Tradition. 1958. online free to borrow
 Yoshida, Shigeru. The Yoshida Memoirs: The Story of Japan in Crisis 1961, on Occupation, 1945–51

References

Historiography of Japan